The 2010 Vuelta a Asturias was the 54th edition of the Vuelta a Asturias road cycling stage race, which was held from 28 April to 2 May 2010. The race started and finished in Oviedo. The race was initially won by Constantino Zaballa of the  team. Zaballa's result was annulled by the Union Cycliste Internationale in 2012, after Zaballa had tested positive for using ephedrine.

General classification

References

Vuelta Asturias
2010 in road cycling
2010 in Spanish sport